Womanpower is a 1926 American comedy film directed by Harry Beaumont and written by Kenneth B. Clarke. The film stars Ralph Graves, Katherine Perry, Margaret Livingston, Ralph Sipperly, Will Walling and David Butler. The film was released on September 19, 1926, by Fox Film Corporation. The short story was remade as Right to the Heart (1942).

Cast         
Ralph Graves as Johnny White Bromley
Katherine Perry as Jenny Killian 
Margaret Livingston as Dot
Ralph Sipperly as Gimp Conway
Will Walling as Jake Killian 
David Butler as Mallory
Lou Tellegen as The Broker
Anders Randolf as Bromley Sr.
Robert Ryan as Sands
Frankie Grandetta as Sheik

References

External links
 

1926 films
1920s English-language films
Silent American comedy films
Fox Film films
Films directed by Harry Beaumont
American silent feature films
American black-and-white films
1926 comedy films
1920s American films